Mohamed Reda Acimi (born 25 May 1969) is an Algerian former football player who played as a goalkeeper.

Acimi was later a manager and goalkeeping coach in Belgium and Algeria.

Honours
 Won the Algerian League twice with MC Oran in 1992, 1993
 Won the Algerian Cup once with MC Oran in 1996
 Won the Arab Cup Winners' Cup once with MC Oran in 1998
 Won the Arab Super Cup once with MC Oran in 1999
 Runner-up of the Algerian League once with ASM Oran in 1991
 Runner-up of the Algerian League once with MC Oran in 2000
 Runner-up of the Arab Champions League once with MC Oran in 2001

References

External links

 Reda Acimi statistics - dzfootball

1969 births
Living people
Footballers from Oran
Algerian footballers
Algeria international footballers
Algerian expatriate sportspeople in Belgium
Algerian expatriate footballers
Expatriate footballers in Belgium
ASM Oran players
MC Oran players
WA Tlemcen players
Association football goalkeepers
Algerian Ligue Professionnelle 1 players
Algerian football managers
R.W.D.M. Brussels F.C. managers
Algerian expatriate football managers
Expatriate football managers in Belgium
21st-century Algerian people